Târșolț is a commune of 3,047 inhabitants situated in Satu Mare County, Romania. It is composed of two villages, Aliceni (Kistartolc) and Târșolț.

At the 2011 census, 100% of inhabitants were ethnic Romanians. 62.8% were Greek-Catholic, 33.8% Romanian Orthodox, 1.4% Roman Catholic and 1.2% Pentecostal.

References

Communes in Satu Mare County